Domingo  Paes (sometimes spelt Pais) was a traveller from Portuguese India, who visited the Vijayanagara Empire, located on the southern portion of the Deccan Plateau in around 1520. He journeyed together with a group of traders from what was then Portuguese Goa, which was the capital of other territories such as Portuguese Bombay. His visit took place during the rule of King Krishnadevaraya, Paes recorded his impressions of Vijayanagara in his work Chronica dos reis de Bisnaga (Indo-Portuguese for "Chronicle of the kings of Vijayanagar"). His detailed account is one of the few known descriptions of that empire and of its capital, Vijayanagara (Hampi), by a chronicler from abroad.

Paes reported, "The kingdom has many places on the coast of India, which are seaports with whom we are at peace, and some of them have factories, in particular at Amcola (Ankola), Mirgeo (Mirjan, 14.48434, 74.42618), Honor, Batecalla, Mamgalor, Bracalor& Bacanor." Paes also records that advanced irrigation technology allowed the kingdom to produce high yields of crops at very reasonable prices, and a wide variety of cultures. He also describes a busy market of precious stones, and that the city was prospering. Its size in the eyes of the narrator, was comparable to Rome, with abundant vegetation, aqueducts& artificial lakes.

See also
List of topics on the Portuguese Empire in the East

References

 . Repub. Adamant Media Corporation, 1982, . Includes a translation of the Chronica by Domingo Paes and Fernão Nunes about 1520 and 1535 respectively.
 Radhakamal Mukerjee, "A history of Indian civilization", Hind Kitabs, 1958 (refers to Paes)
 H. V. Sreenivasa Murthy, R. Ramakrishnan, A history of Karnataka, from the earliest times to the present day, S. Chand, 1977

External links
 
 

Portuguese explorers
Portuguese Renaissance writers
Portuguese travel writers
Vijayanagara Empire
16th-century explorers
Explorers of Asia
16th-century Portuguese people